And the Pursuit of Happiness is a 1986 documentary film for television directed by Louis Malle about the experiences of immigrants in the United States during the 1980s. It was originally released as part of HBO's America Undercover series on Independence Day 1986. The film "appeared at a time when immigrants from Latin America and Asia for the first time outnumbered those coming from Europe". It was screened in the Un Certain Regard section at the 1987 Cannes Film Festival. It was released on public television in 1988 and won a Peabody Award the following year.

Cast
 Louis Malle as narrator
 General José R. Somoza as himself
 Derek Walcott as himself
 Franklin Chang-Díaz as himself

References

External links

1986 films
1986 documentary films
1986 independent films
American documentary films
American independent films
Films directed by Louis Malle
Documentary films about immigration to the United States
1980s English-language films
1980s American films